Sherlock Holmes: Consulting Detective is a full-motion video game released in 1991. It is based on a tabletop game-gamebook hybrid of the same name first published in 1981, and features the fictional detective Sherlock Holmes, created by Arthur Conan Doyle.

The video game was originally developed by ICOM Simulations for the FM Towns computer and later ported to DOS, Macintosh, Commodore CDTV, TurboGrafx-CD, Sega CD and Tandy Video Information System with all versions being distributed on CD-ROM. The game was re-released as a DVD for use with a standard DVD player and television in 1999.  A high resolution and re-mastered version of the game for iPad, Microsoft Windows, and OS X was released on September 18, 2012.

Premise 
The game uses live actors and sets as the player controls Sherlock Holmes and his longtime partner Dr. Watson, trying to solve three separate crimes by visiting various locations, listening to the dialogue, reading the included mock London newspapers, and, when the player gets enough evidence, answering the judge's questions.

Gameplay 
At the beginning of each case a full motion video clip depicts Holmes and Watson meeting a client and learning a few background clues about the case. Then the player must choose a particular location or person from the directory to visit, read the London newspapers for clues or ask one of the young Baker Street Irregulars to investigate. A full motion video clip will play each time the player visits a relevant person or location. Selecting an irrelevant location to visit results in a short audio clip of dialogue between Holmes and Watson, and impacts the player's score. The object of each case is to gather enough clues in the lowest number of visits possible, then go before a judge who will then ask the player to answer the important questions about the case. If the player is successful, Dr. Watson will reveal the player's score, based on the number of visits it took to solve the case. The player can view a full motion video clip set in Holmes' and Watson's study where they will review the events that transpired.

There are several general informants (also portrayed by actors) who can be visited in multiple cases across the Consulting Detective games, including characters from Arthur Conan Doyle's Sherlock Holmes stories, namely Inspector Lestrade of Scotland Yard, former criminal Shinwell Johnson, and gossip columnist Langdale Pike.

Story and Setting

The Mummy's Curse
This investigation is set on 12 April 1889. Holmes and Watson learn about a series of mysterious deaths of three men who were part of an archeology trip to Egypt.  Each man was found strangled with a sheath of a mummy's wrapping present at each murder.  The London Times believes the deaths were caused by an ancient mummy, creating mass hysteria.  Holmes and Watson decide to take on the case to find the real culprit but they face a challenge, since only one murder was in London while another was in Egypt and another was at sea.

Development
The game had a budget of more than $2 million.

The Tin Soldier

The investigation takes place on 10 June 1890. An old general is murdered in his home by a mysterious visitor who quickly vanishes from the scene of the crime.  Holmes and Watson investigate to see whether the crime was due to the general's part in a Veteran Tontine, a book he was writing on a missing diamond, a disgruntled marriage, or something hidden deep in his past.

The Mystified Murderess

This case takes place on 4 July 1888. Francis Nolan is found hovering over the body of her lover, Guy Clarendon, in a London hotel with a pistol in her hand.  She is convicted of Guy's murder, despite having no memory of ever being there, nor purchasing the gun that was bought in her name.  She insists that she is innocent as Holmes and Watson take on the case to see if she is telling the truth.  Along the way, Holmes and Watson learn about Guy Clarendon's dark past.

Reception 

The three volumes of Sherlock Holmes: Consulting Detective sold over 360,000 copies across all platforms by 1994.

Dragon gave the TurboGrafx-CD version of Sherlock Holmes 5 out of 5 stars. Computer Gaming World favorably described the game's videos' production values as "low-end television production quality ... equal to an average public television production". The magazine recommended the game "with qualifications", calling it "a ground-breaking product with whiz-bang technology that demonstrates the full potential of multimedia", but with "limited play life" due to lack of replayability. In a review for Wizard, Glenn Rubenstein listed the use of live actors and the absence of slow down in the Sega CD version as strong points, but remarked that "The interactivity level is lacking", and that the Sega CD version offered nothing new to those who had played any of the game's previous versions. He gave it a B. In a retrospective review, Jonathan Sutyak of Allgame gave the Sega CD version a score of 2.5 out of 5 stars praising the actors and the dialogue being clear and well acted, although commenting that there is a large amount of FMV and little gameplay and felt the game "does not offer the player enough to do."  He concluded the review writing: "Unfortunately, even if you like solving cases, Sherlock Holmes: Consulting Detective will probably bore you."

Reviews
Ação Games (Dec, 1993)
Mega Drive Advanced Gaming (May, 1993)
MegaTech (Apr, 1993)
TurboPlay (Apr, 1991)
Power Play (Dec, 1992)

Legacy 
In April 1994 Computer Gaming World said that video quality had improved during the three games of the series, with each offering "solid and professional" acting. The magazine added that "The chief strengths of these games, though, are the challenging cases the player is asked to unravel".

Sequels 
A sequel to the game was also released in 1992 called Sherlock Holmes: Consulting Detective Vol. II with three new cases to be solved.   A third entry, with three new cases, was also released, albeit not for the Sega CD nor the Turbografx-CD.

Kickstarter 
On March 16, 2012, a Kickstarter campaign was launched by David Marsh and his company Zojoi to help fund a high resolution and remastered version of the Sherlock Holmes: Consulting Detective Adventure Mysteries.  The campaign was unsuccessful, as it was only able to attain a third of its $55,000 goal.  Even though the Kickstarter was unsuccessful, the remastered version was still released.  According to developer David Marsh, the Kickstarter money was never needed to fund the games, and Zojoi was just using the Kickstarter to raise awareness about them.

References

External links 

Sherlock Holmes: Consulting Detective at The Legacy
Sherlock Holmes: Consulting Detective at Hall Of Light

1991 video games
Fiction set in 1888
Fiction set in 1889
Fiction set in 1890
Video games set in the 1880s
Video games set in the 1890s
Adventure games
Commodore CDTV games
Detective video games
DOS games
DVD interactive technology
FM Towns games
Full motion video based games
ICOM Simulations games
Interactive movie video games
IOS games
Classic Mac OS games
MacOS games
Sega CD games
TurboGrafx-CD games
Consulting Detective
Video games developed in the United States
Video games set in Egypt
Video games set in London
Windows games
Fiction about mummies